George Lyall may refer to:

 George Lyall (1779–1853), British businessman, Member of Parliament (MP) for the City of London 1833–1835 and 1841–1847
 George Lyall (1819–1881), Member of Parliament (MP) for Whitehaven 1857–1865
 George Lyall (footballer) (born 1947), Scottish footballer (Raith Rovers, Preston North End, Nottingham Forest, Hull City)
 George Lyall (merchant), merchant in Hong Kong region and unofficial member of Legislative Council in 1860–1861